Ghulam Nabi Nasher (10 May 1926 – 25 June 2010) was the son of Loe Khan Nasher and grandson of Sher Khan Nasher. He was an ethnic Pushtun, the hereditary Khan of the Kharoti (Ghilzai) tribe, born in Qarabagh, Ghazni. Ghulam Nabi Nasher was the Mayor of Kunduz and later he was elected for two terms as a Senator from Kunduz. During the time of King Zaher Shah, he served as the president for the upper house (house of Lords) of the Afghan Parliament. 
He was an avid philanthropist and bequeathed his home in Falls Church VA to the local Islamic center.

Pashtun people
1926 births
2010 deaths
Members of the House of Elders (Afghanistan)
Presidents of the House of Elders (Afghanistan)
Mayors of places in Afghanistan